The word linear comes from the Latin word , which means "created by lines".

Mathematics 
 Linearity
 Linear algebra
 Linear code
 Linear cryptanalysis
 Linear equation
 Linear function
 Linear functional
 Linear map
 Linear programming, a type of optimization problem
 Linear system
 Linear system of equations
 Linear transformation

Technology 
 Particularly in electronics, a device whose characteristic or transfer function is linear, in the mathematical sense, is called linear
 Linear amplifier, a component of amateur radio equipment
 Linear element, part of an electric circuit
 Linear motor a type of electric motor
 Linear phase, a property of an electronic filter
 Linear Technology, an integrated circuit manufacturer
 Linearity (computer and video games)

Other uses 
 A kind of leaf shape in botany
 LINEAR, the Lincoln Near-Earth Asteroid Research project
 Linear A, one of two scripts used in ancient Crete
 Linear B, a script that was used for writing Mycenaean, an early form of Greek
 Linear counterpoint in music
 Linear narrative structure
 Linear (group), a pop music group popular in the 1990s
 Linear (album), their group's debut album
 Linear (film), a film that was released with the U2 album No Line on the Horizon
 Linear molecular geometry in chemistry
 Linear motion, motion along a straight line
 Linearity (writing), describing whether symbols in a writing system are composed of lines
 A kind of typeface in the VOX-ATypI classification

See also
 Curvilinear
 Rectilinear (disambiguation)
 Straight (disambiguation)